The 2012–13 Ohio Bobcats women's basketball team represented Ohio University during the 2012–13 NCAA Division I women's basketball season. The Bobcats, led by fifth year head coach Semeka Randall in her final year at the helm, played their home games at the Convocation Center in Athens, Ohio as a member of the Mid-American Conference. They finished the season 6–23 and 1–15 in MAC play. After the season Randall was fired.

Preseason
The preseason poll and league awards were announced by the league office on October 30, 2012. Ohio was picked fourth in the MAC East

Preseason women's basketball poll
(First place votes in parenthesis)

East Division
  (16)
  (13)
  (1)
 Ohio

West Division
  (24)
  (6)

Tournament champs
Toledo (16), Central Michigan (12), Bowling Green (2)

Schedule

|-
!colspan=9 style=| Non-conference regular season

|-
!colspan=9 style=| MAC regular season

|-
!colspan=9 style=| MAC Tournament

|-

Awards and honors

All-MAC Awards

References

Ohio
Ohio Bobcats women's basketball seasons
Ohio Bobcats women's basketball
Ohio Bobcats women's basketball